Michael John Myers OC (born May 25, 1963) is a Canadian actor, comedian, screenwriter, and producer. His accolades include seven MTV Awards, a Primetime Emmy Award, and a Screen Actors Guild Award. In 2002, he was awarded a star on the Hollywood Walk of Fame. In 2017, he was named an Officer of the Order of Canada for "his extensive and acclaimed body of comedic work as an actor, writer, and producer."

Following a series of appearances on several Canadian television programs, Myers came to recognition during his six seasons as a cast member on the NBC sketch comedy series Saturday Night Live from 1989 to 1995, which won him the Primetime Emmy Award for Outstanding Writing for a Comedy Series. He subsequently earned praise and numerous accolades for playing the title roles in the Wayne's World (1992–1993), Austin Powers (1997–2002), and Shrek (2001–2010) franchises, the latter of which is the second highest-grossing animated film franchise.

Myers acted sporadically in the 2010s, notably having supporting roles in Terminal and Bohemian Rhapsody (both 2018). He made his directorial debut with the documentary Supermensch: The Legend of Shep Gordon (2013), which premiered at the Toronto International Film Festival. He created and starred in the 2022 Netflix original series, The Pentaverate, and appeared in David O. Russell's Amsterdam.

Early life 
Michael John Myers was born in the Scarborough district of Toronto on May 25, 1963, to data processor Alice "Bunny" E. (née Hind) and insurance agent Eric Myers. His parents were English immigrants from the Old Swan area of Liverpool. Both were World War II veterans, his mother having served in the Women's Royal Air Force and his father in the British Army. He has distant Scottish ancestry. He has two older brothers: Paul, a musician, and Peter, who worked for Sears Canada. He grew up in Scarborough and North York, where he attended Sir John A. Macdonald Collegiate Institute. He graduated from Stephen Leacock Collegiate Institute in 1982.

One of his neighbors and schoolmates was prominent voice actor Maurice LaMarche.

Career

Early career 
Myers began performing in commercials at two years old. At the age of 10, he made a commercial for British Columbia Hydro, with Gilda Radner playing his mother. At 12, he made a guest appearance as Ari on the TV series King of Kensington. At 16, he was the guest star of the season 1 episode "Boy on Wheels" of the TV series The Littlest Hobo.

After graduating from high school, Myers was accepted into The Second City Canadian touring company. He moved to the United Kingdom, and in 1985 he was one of the founding members of The Comedy Store Players, an improvisational group based at The Comedy Store in London.

The next year, he starred in the British children's TV program Wide Awake Club, parodying the show's normal exuberance with his own "Sound Asleep Club", in partnership with Neil Mullarkey.

He returned to Toronto and The Second City in 1986 as a cast member in The Second City's Toronto main stage show, Second City Theatre. In 1988, he moved from Second City in Toronto to Chicago. There, he trained, performed and taught at the Improv Olympic.

Myers made many appearances, including as Wayne Campbell, on Toronto's Citytv in the early 1980s, on the alternative video show City Limits hosted by Christopher Ward; Myers also made several appearances after the launch of MuchMusic, for which City Limits was essentially the prototype. Myers also appeared as Wayne Campbell in the music video for Ward's Canadian hit "Boys and Girls".

The Wayne Campbell character was featured extensively in the 1986 summer series It's Only Rock & Roll, produced by Toronto's Insight Production Company for CBC Television. Wayne appeared both in-studio and in a series of location sketches directed and edited by Allan Novak. Myers wrote another sketch, "Kurt and Dieter", co-starring with Second City's Dana Andersen and also directed by Novak, which later became the popular "Sprockets" sketch on Saturday Night Live.

Saturday Night Live 
Myers began appearing on Saturday Night Live on January 21, 1989 and eventually became the first repertory player added to the show's cast in over two years. "He quickly became one of the show's biggest draws thanks to his talent for creating oddball characters with memorable catchphrases," according to Entertainment Weekly. In addition to "Wayne's World" and "Sprockets", Myers starred in the recurring sketches "Lothar of the Hill People", "Stuart Rankin, All Things Scottish", "Lank Thompson", "Middle-Aged Man", "Simon", "Coffee Talk with Linda Richman", "Theatre Stories", "Phillip the Hyper Hypo", and "Scottish Soccer Hooligan Weekly".  Myers's last episode as a cast member aired on January 21, 1995 (exactly six years to the day after his first episode aired). He returned to host in 1997 and made an appearance as his movie character Dr. Evil in 2014.

Saturday Night Live characters 
 Dieter – host of Sprockets
 Linda Richman – hostess of Coffee Talk
 Japanese Game Show Host
 "Handsome Actor" Lank Thompson
 Simon – a young British boy who makes drawings in his bath tub and complains about having "prune hands" (the theme song for this segment was a slightly modified version of the theme song from Simon in the Land of Chalk Drawings by Edward MacLachlan)
 Wayne Campbell (SNL, the Wayne's World films)
 Pat Arnold (SNL, Bill Swerski's Superfans)
 Stuart Rankin – proprietor of "All Things Scottish"
 Lothar (Of the Hill People)
 Ed Miles (Middle-Aged Man) – An older man who helps young people with their problems
 Phillip – A child of the age of six who is hypoglycemic and hyperactive (quote: "I'm a hyper hypo"). Phillip appears in at least two sketches, one with Nicole Kidman and the other with Kim Basinger. The sketch centers on him at a playground while wearing a helmet and a harness tied to the monkey bars.
 Kenneth Reese-Evans – host of "Theatre Stories"
 Johnny Letter – an Old West citizen who writes polite, well-written letters of complaint.
 In December 2014, Myers appeared in a cameo during the cold open as his character Dr. Evil, a super villain known for his appearances in the Austin Powers film series where he called out North Korea and Sony, in particular the logic of Kim Jong-un, and the 2014 Sony hack, as well as making comparisons between the Guardians of Peace and the Grand Old Party.

Film 

Myers made his film debut when he and Dana Carvey adapted their "Wayne's World" Saturday Night Live (SNL) sketches into the feature Wayne's World (1992). It was among the most successful films of the year and was followed in 1993 by Wayne's World 2; Myers starred in So I Married an Axe Murderer the same year. He took a two-year hiatus from performing after the end of his time as an SNL regular.

Myers returned to acting with the film Austin Powers: International Man of Mystery (1997), followed by the sequels Austin Powers: The Spy Who Shagged Me (1999) and Austin Powers in Goldmember (2002). Myers played the title role (Austin Powers) and the villain (Dr. Evil) in all three films as well as a henchman (Fat Bastard) and another villain (Goldmember) in the sequels.

One of Myers's rare non-comedic roles came in the film 54 (1998), in which he portrayed Steve Rubell, proprietor of New York City's famous 1970s disco nightclub Studio 54. The film was not critically or commercially successful, though Myers received some positive notice.

In June 2000, Myers was sued by Universal Pictures for 3.8 million for backing out of a contract to make a feature film based on his SNL character Dieter. Myers said he refused to honor the 20 million contract because he felt his script was not ready. Myers countersued and a settlement was reached after several months where Myers agreed to make another film with Universal. That film, The Cat in the Hat, was released in November 2003 and starred Myers as the title character. It received negative reviews and was unsuccessful at the box office.

In 2001, Myers provided the voice of the eponymous character, Shrek in the animated film of the same name, having taken over the role after the originally planned voice actor Chris Farley died in December 1997 before recording all of his dialogue. He reprised this role in Shrek 4-D (a theme park ride) in 2003, Shrek 2 (2004), Shrek the Third (2007), the Christmas and Halloween television specials Shrek the Halls (2007) and Scared Shrekless (2010), and Shrek Forever After (2010).

Myers received the MTV Generation Award in June 2007, making him the second Canadian to win the award (following Jim Carrey in 2006).

In 2008, Myers co-wrote, co-produced and starred in the poorly received The Love Guru, and in 2009 had a minor role as British general Ed Fenech in Quentin Tarantino's Inglourious Basterds.

In 2018, after an eight-year hiatus from feature films, Myers appeared in supporting roles in Terminal (2018) and Bohemian Rhapsody (2018).

In May 2022, Myers provided a cryptic message that implied an Austin Powers 4 would be forthcoming.

Other work 
Myers had a cameo appearance in Britney Spears' music video "Boys" as Austin Powers. Britney Spears, in turn, made a cameo in Austin Powers in Goldmember, performing "Boys". In a 2005 poll to find The Comedian's Comedian, he was voted among the top 50 comedy acts by fellow comedians and comedy insiders.

Myers is a member of the band Ming Tea along with The Bangles' guitarist and vocalist Susanna Hoffs and musician Matthew Sweet. They performed the songs "BBC" and "Daddy Wasn't There" from the Austin Powers films. In 2011 Myers returned to The Comedy Store in London to perform a one night only comeback of his role with The Comedy Store Players. The UK comedy website Chortle praised his performance.

Myers's 2013 directorial debut, Supermensch: The Legend of Shep Gordon, was selected to be screened in the Gala Presentation section at the 2013 Toronto International Film Festival. In 2017, Myers began hosting a reprised version of The Gong Show in heavy makeup as a fictional British host known as Tommy Maitland, though his identity was not confirmed until the second season.

An avid follower of the Monty Python comedy troupe, in July 2014 Myers appeared on stage at the O2 Arena on the final night of their 10 dates live show, Monty Python Live (Mostly), and also appears on the documentary telefilm Monty Python: The Meaning of Live.<ref>Harvey, Dennis. Film Review: 'Monty Python: The Meaning of Live'. Variety May 2, 2015</ref>

From 2017 to 2018, Myers hosted a re-boot of The Gong Show using heavy prosthetics and disguised as "British comedian" Tommy Maitland, a fictional character. 

In April 2019, Variety reported that Myers will be starring in and executive producing a comedy series for Netflix, which will last for six episodes and involve him playing multiple characters. In June 2021, the series title was announced as The Pentaverate, which serves as a spin-off of So I Married an Axe Murderer.

 Personal life 

Myers began dating actress and comedy writer Robin Ruzan in the late 1980s after meeting at an ice hockey game in Chicago, during which Myers caught a puck and used the incident as an icebreaker to strike up a conversation with Ruzan. The couple married on May 22, 1993, and Myers later referred to Ruzan as "his muse". The couple filed for divorce in December 2005.

In 2006, Kelly Tisdale confirmed reports that she and Myers were dating. Myers and Tisdale married in New York City in a secret ceremony in late 2010. Tisdale is a scenic artist who works in the entertainment industry and a former cafe owner. They have a son and two daughters. They reside in the Tribeca neighborhood of New York City.

Myers is a Dungeons & Dragons player and was one of several celebrities to have participated in the Worldwide Dungeons & Dragons Game Day in 2006. He supports the Toronto Maple Leafs ice hockey team, and named two characters in the first Austin Powers film Commander Gilmour and General Borschevsky, after then-Maple Leafs players Doug Gilmour and Nikolai Borschevsky. He is also a fan of his parents' hometown football team Liverpool FC.

Myers has played for Hollywood United FC, a celebrity soccer team. He played in the 2010 Soccer Aid for UNICEF UK football match, England vs. R.O.W (Rest of the World) and scored his penalty during a sudden-death shootout after the game ended 2–2 (June 6, 2010). The Rest of the World team beat England for the first time since the tournament started.

In 2014, Myers starred in a commercial with his brother Peter for Sears Canada, using "humorous banter to spread the message that, despite rumours, Sears wasn't shutting down". Peter at the time was senior director of planning at Sears' head office in Toronto, and he was laid off in 2017 after Sears Canada filed for bankruptcy.

In 2016, Myers published a book, Canada'', a memoir interwoven with reflections on his native country's history and popular culture and the renaissance represented by the election of Prime Minister Justin Trudeau.

Filmography

Film

Television

Theme parks

Music videos 
 Madonna: "Beautiful Stranger" (1999) as Austin Powers
 Britney Spears: "Boys" (2002) as Austin Powers
 Smash Mouth: "Hang On" (2003)

Awards and honours

Honours 

 In 2002, Mike Myers was honoured with a star on the Hollywood Walk of Fame at 7042 Hollywood Boulevard.
 Also in 2002, Myers was honoured in his native Scarborough, Toronto with a street named after him, "Mike Myers Drive." 
 In 2003, he was inducted into Canada's Walk of Fame.
 In 2014, his face was put on a stamp by Canada Post.
 In, 2017, he was named an Officer of the Order of Canada by Governor General David Johnston for "his extensive and acclaimed body of comedic work as an actor, writer and producer."

References

External links

 
 
  in 2008

1963 births
Living people
20th-century Canadian comedians
20th-century Canadian male actors
20th-century Canadian male writers
20th-century Canadian non-fiction writers
21st-century Canadian comedians
21st-century Canadian male actors
21st-century Canadian male writers
21st-century Canadian non-fiction writers
Association football players not categorized by nationality
Association footballers not categorized by position
Canadian Comedy Award winners
Canadian expatriate male actors in the United States
Canadian expatriate writers in the United States
Canadian expatriates in the United Kingdom
Canadian game show hosts
Canadian impressionists (entertainers)
Canadian male child actors
Canadian male comedians
Canadian male film actors
Canadian male non-fiction writers
Canadian male screenwriters
Canadian male television actors
Canadian male voice actors
Canadian people of English descent
20th-century Canadian screenwriters
Canadian sketch comedians
Canadian parodists
Comedians from Toronto
Hollywood United players
Male actors from Toronto
Ming Tea members
Officers of the Order of Canada
Outstanding Performance by a Cast in a Motion Picture Screen Actors Guild Award winners
Primetime Emmy Award winners
Writers from Scarborough, Toronto
21st-century Canadian screenwriters